Hailey Caitlin Rose Duff  (born 24 January 1997) is a Scottish curler from Forfar. She is the 2022 Olympic Champion in women's curling.

At the international level, she is a  curler, playing lead for skip Eve Muirhead.

At the national level, she is a Scottish women's championship bronze medallist (2019), Scottish mixed doubles championship bronze medallist (2015), Scottish junior champion curler (2018) and silver medallist (2016, 2017).

Duff was appointed Member of the Order of the British Empire (MBE) in the 2022 Birthday Honours for services to curling.

Teams

Women's

Mixed

Mixed doubles

Personal life
Hailey Duff was born and grew up in New Zealand. Some years later her family moved to Scotland.

She is from family of curlers. Her father John Duff is a long time curler, and was the runner-up at the 2020 Scottish Senior Championships, and is a bronze medallist with his daughter at the 2015 Scottish Mixed Doubles Championship.)

Duff works as an assistant buyer at Garden Furniture Scotland and is also studying sport and fitness at The Open University.

She graduated from the University of Stirling in 2019 with a degree in Business and Finance.

References

External links

 
 
 Team Wilson (2021)
 
 Video: 

Living people
1997 births
Sportspeople from Auckland
Scottish female curlers
European curling champions
New Zealand emigrants to the United Kingdom
Curlers at the 2022 Winter Olympics
Olympic curlers of Great Britain
Alumni of the University of Stirling
People from Forfar
Medalists at the 2022 Winter Olympics
Olympic gold medallists for Great Britain
Olympic medalists in curling
Scottish curling champions
Scottish Olympic medallists
Members of the Order of the British Empire